In filmmaking and video production, a shot is a series of frames that runs for an uninterrupted period of time.  Film shots are an essential aspect of a movie where angles, transitions and cuts are used to further express emotion, ideas and movement.  The term "shot" can refer to two different parts of the filmmaking process:
In production, a shot is the moment that the camera starts rolling until the moment it stops.
In film editing, a shot is the continuous footage or sequence between two edits or cuts.

Etymology
The term "shot" is derived from the early days of film production when cameras were hand-cranked, and operated similarly to the hand-cranked machine guns of the time. That is, a cameraman would "shoot" film the way someone would "shoot" bullets from a machine gun.

Categories of shots 

Shots can be categorized in a number of ways.

By field size

The field size explains how much of the subject and its surrounding area is visible within the camera's field of view, and is determined by two factors: the distance of the subject from the camera ("camera-subject distance") and the focal length of the lens. Note that the shorter a lens's focal length, the wider its angle of view (the 'angle' in wide-angle lens, for instance, which is "how much you see"), so the same idea can also be expressed as that the lens's angle of view plus camera-subject distance is the camera's field of view.

Caution: In this context, the focal length value differs with each film gauge and CCD size for optical reasons, but the angle of view is the same for any of them, so it's easier comparing the angle of view with lenses for different formats than their focal lengths. The same angle of view always gives the same field size at the same camera-subject distance no matter what format you're using, but the same focal length does not.

For in-depth information behind the laws of optics regarding the influence that focal length and different formats have on field sizes, see 35 mm equivalent focal length, crop factor, image sensor format, and Digital photography: Sensor size and angle of view.

The same field size can be achieved at varied camera-subject distances by using a lens with a compensating focal length, and at varied focal lengths by choosing a compensating camera-subject distance. Field size differs from framing in that within professional environments where prime lenses are dominant, the latter applies only to camera placement (including camera angle), not focal length.
 
However, maintaining an identical field size at varying camera-subject distances and focal lengths must be handled with caution as it applies different amounts of perspective distortion to the image: wide-angle lenses expand a perspective, while long focus lenses compress a perspective. The famous dolly zoom, taken with a variable focal length lens, is a vivid, intuitive demonstration of this effect. Thus, it's more common in photography and cinematography to determine an image's field size by only changing one out of the two factors.

When shooting video or film with human subjects, it is best to avoid cutting off human subjects with the bottom of the frame at the natural cut-off points (joints, neck). When the frame cuts off the subject at these positions, it looks unnatural. Therefore, filmmakers utilize the following shot types because the brain understands that the body continues beneath what it sees in the frame. This is because of a psychological term called closure that refers to the human brain seeking complete perception of the subject. The field size (along with the specific amount of perspective distortion) greatly affects the narrative power of a shot. There are a number of standardized field sizes, the names of which are commonly derived from varying camera-subject distances while not changing the lens. Four basic kinds of field sizes (marked with an asterisk* in the gallery below) are:

the long shot or wide shot (often used as an establishing shot), that shows the environment around the subjects,
the full shot, where the entirety of the subject is just visible within the frame,
the medium-long shot, where the frame ends near the knees,
the medium shot, where the frame stops either just above or just below the waist,
the medium close-up, where more of the shoulder is visible than in the close-up,
the close-up, where the shoulder line is visible,
the extreme close-up, where the frame stops at the subject's chin and forehead.

Three less often used field sizes (see gallery below) are:

the extreme long shot (used for epic views and panoramas),
the American shot (also 3/4 shot), a slight variation of the medium-long shot to also include OWB handgun holsters in Western movies, a characterization from French film criticism for a type of shot in certain American films of the 1930s and 1940s also referred to as a "Cowboy shot" in reference to the gun holster being just above the bottom frame line,
the "Italian shot", where only a person's eyes are visible, named after the genre of Italo-Westerns, particularly the Dollars Trilogy by Sergio Leone, that established this particular field size.

By camera placement 
"Shots" referring to camera placement and angle rather than field size include:

Camera angles:
the aerial shot,
the bird's-eye shot (sometimes performed as a crane shot),
the low-angle shot,
the over the shoulder shot,
the point of view shot,
the reverse shot is defined as a 180-degree camera turn to the preceding image, common in point of view and over the shoulder (in the latter, care must be applied to avoid a continuity error by violating the 180 degree rule),
the two shot where two people are in the picture.

By other criteria 
the establishing shot is defined by giving an establishing "broad overview" over a scene, whether performed by a wide shot with a fixed camera, a zoom, a series of different close-ups achieved by camera motion, or a sequence of independent close-angle shots edited right after each other,
the master shot is a scene done in one single take, with no editing,
the freeze frame shot is created in editing by displaying a single frame for an elongated duration of time,
the insert shot is created in editing by replacing a picture with another while the audio stays the same (common in interviews to illustrate topics mentioned).
the Tayenaka shot is when the 4th take is the best take 
the Trolley shot  A shot in which the camera moves toward or away from its subject while filming. Traditionally dolly shots are filmed from a camera dolly but the same motion may also be performed with a Steadicam, gimbal, etc. A dolly shot is generally described in terms of "dollying in" or "dollying out". Trucking in and out is also a common synonym
the "Martini shot" is a term for the final set-up of the day as named by Cody Whitehouse (aka Christopher R. Martini). Shot was so named because "the next shot is out of a glass", referring to a post-wrap drink.

Film editing 

Cutting between shots taken at different times or from different perspectives is known as film editing, and is one of the central arts of filmmaking.

Duration

The length of shots is an important consideration that can greatly affect a film.  The purpose of editing any given scene is to create a representation of the way the scene might be perceived by the "story teller."  Shots with a longer duration can make a scene seem more relaxed and slower paced whereas shots with a shorter duration can make a scene seem urgent and faster paced.

The average shot length (ASL) of a film is one of its cinemetrical measures. For example, The Mist has a length of 117 minutes and consists of 1292 shots, so the ASL is 5.4 seconds, while Russian Ark is a single 96-minute long take, so an ASL of 96 minutes or about 5,760 seconds, a factor of 1,000 difference.

Shots with extremely long durations are difficult to do because any error in the shot would force the filmmaker to restart from scratch, and are thus only occasionally used.  Films famous for their long cuts include Francis Ford Coppola's The Godfather in which the entire first scene is a long take featuring Bonasera describing the assault on his daughter, and Alfred Hitchcock's Rope, which only cuts at the end of each reel, and does so surreptitiously so that it seems as if the whole film is one take. Orson Welles's Touch of Evil opens with a long tracking crane shot, as does Robert Altman's The Player.

In addition to Russian Ark, which was made in 2002 using digital recording technology, other films known for their extremely long takes include Stanley Kubrick's 2001: A Space Odyssey and the works of Andrei Tarkovsky starting with Solaris. Béla Tarr is also known for using very long takes consistently in his films. Joss Whedon's feature film Serenity introduces the main characters with a long take. Although Fish & Cat is a single 134-minute long take, the narrator succeeded in playing with time and including several flashbacks.

See also

 Camera angle
 Film frame
 Filmmaking
 Two cut
 Take
 List of one-shot music videos

References

Film production
Film editing